Alistair James Potts (born 7 July 1971) is a former British World Champion cox.

Potts was born in Chertsey, Surrey, and educated at Winchester College and the University of Edinburgh, where he studied architectural history. He coxed the men's four, men's lightweight eight and women's eight at the 1994 Commonwealth Regatta representing Scotland. After going up to Trinity Hall, Cambridge, at the end of 1994, he was winning coxswain in the record-breaking CUWBC crew at the 1995 Women's Boat Race. This was quickly followed by coxing Trinity Hall BC to the headship in the May Bumps. In 1996 Potts was selected for Goldie, which beat Isis by 11 lengths in a then record time. That year, he also won the Ladies' Challenge Plate at Henley Royal Regatta with CUBC (rowing as Goldie Boat Club). In 1998 he steered the record-breaking Cambridge Blue Boat in the Boat Race.

Potts won a silver medal at the 1999 World Championships at St. Catharines, Canada in the coxed four with Jonny Searle, Jonny Singfield, Rick Dunn and Graham Smith. Gold came in 2000 at Zagreb in the same boat class with Dunn, Smith and Toby Garbett and Steve Williams. This was the first time Great Britain had won the coxed four at the World Rowing Championships since its inception. That same crew also won the Prince Philip Challenge Cup at Henley.

Potts' rowing career finished in 2000 coinciding with the completion of his doctoral thesis on "The Development of the Playhouse in Seventeenth-Century London". Potts is now a writer and broadcaster, and had a brief acting part in the Australian soap opera Neighbours in 2004. He and his wife Emily are directors of Party Ark, an internet-based children's party supplies business and administer the Titulus Regius website on the history of Richard III. Since 2013 he has been a director of New York-based solar finance company Open Energy Group.

Achievements

World Rowing Championships Medals: 1 Gold, 1 Silver (Great Britain)
Henley Royal Regatta Medals: 2 Gold (Goldie BC and Leander Club)
Blue Boat / Women's Blue Boat Wins: 2 (Cambridge University)

World championships

2000 – Gold, Coxed Four (with Steve Williams, Rick Dunn, Toby Garbett, Graham Smith)
1999 – Silver, Coxed Four (with Jonny Singfield, Jonny Searle, Rick Dunn, Graham Smith)

See also
List of Cambridge University Boat Race crews

References

External links
BBC Interview

1971 births
Living people
Cambridge University Boat Club rowers
English male rowers
Coxswains (rowing)
People educated at Winchester College
Alumni of the University of Edinburgh
Alumni of Trinity Hall, Cambridge
Sportspeople from Chertsey
Members of Leander Club
World Rowing Championships medalists for Great Britain